Cassiopean Empire is a role-playing game published by Norton Games in 1982.

Description
Cassiopean Empire is a science-fiction space-adventure system, with rules for character creation, spaceships, star systems, aliens, robots, and a description of the interstellar Empire.

Publication history
Cassiopean Empire was designed by Raymond Norton, and published by Norton Games in 1982 as a 16-page book with a character record sheet. The game included art by F.Scott McKown.

Reception
Allen Varney reviewed the 1985 release of Advanced Cassiopeian Empire in Space Gamer No. 76. Varney commented that "There's so much wrong with this game that I can't even find the parts that are right . . . assuming there are any. Such searching doesn't seem worth the effort."

Lawrence Schick called this game "Amateurish", and noted that the character creation rules were similar to Traveller.

References

Role-playing games introduced in 1982
Science fiction role-playing games